Oreste Sindici (May 31, 1828 – January 12, 1904) was an Italian-born Colombian musician and composer. He composed the music for the Colombian national anthem in 1887.

He was born in Ceccano (Province of Frosinone) and studied in the Accademia Nazionale di Santa Cecilia at Rome.

He arrived in Bogotá in 1863 as a singer with an opera company and lived and worked as a musician in Colombia until his death. In 1887 he was asked to compose the music to a poem written by Rafael Núñez. The song was released on November 11, 1887, in commemoration of the Independence of Cartagena de Indias. In 1920 this song officially became the Colombian national anthem.

Oreste Sindici died in Bogotá on January 12, 1904, due to severe arteriosclerosis. In 1937 the Colombian government honored his memory.

References 

Italian male composers
Colombian composers
Academic staff of the Accademia Nazionale di Santa Cecilia
People of Lazian descent
Italian operatic tenors
Naturalized citizens of Colombia
1828 births
1904 deaths
Burials at Central Cemetery of Bogotá
19th-century Colombian male opera singers
Italian emigrants to Colombia
National anthem writers
Deaths from arteriosclerosis
19th-century Italian male opera singers